This is a demography of Barbados including population density, ethnicity, education level, health of the populace, economic status, religious affiliations and other aspects of the population.

Population

At the 2010 census Barbados had an estimated population of 277,821. The tabulated population was only 226,193 due to a high undercount (estimated at 18%).

Race

The population of Barbados is predominantly black (91%) or mixed (4%). 3.5% of the population is white and 1% South Asian. The remaining 0.5% of the population includes East Asians (0.1%).

Languages
English is the official language of Barbados, and is used for communications, administration, and public services all over the island. In its capacity as the official language of the country, the standard of English tends to conform to the vocabulary, pronunciations, spellings, and conventions akin to, but not exactly the same as, those of British English.

A regional variant of English referred to locally as Bajan is spoken by most Barbadians in everyday life especially in informal settings. In its full-fledged form, Bajan sounds markedly different from the Standard English heard on the island. The degree of intelligibility between Bajan and general English depends on the level of creolised vocabulary and idioms. A Bajan speaker may be completely unintelligible to an English speaker from another country. Bajan is influenced by other Caribbean English dialects.

There was no indigenous language on Barbados.

Religion

According to the 2010 census, 75.6% of the population of Barbados are considered Christian, 2.6% have a non-Christian religion and 20.6% have no religion.

Anglicanism constitutes the largest religious group, with 23.9% of the population. It is represented by the Church in the Province of the West Indies, within which the island belongs to the Diocese of Barbados. Pentecostals are the second largest group (19.5%).

The next largest group are Seventh-day Adventists, 5.9% of the population, followed by Methodists (4.2%). 3.8% of the population are Roman Catholics.  Other Christians include Wesleyans (3.4%), Nazarenes (3.2%), Church of God (2.4%), Jehovah's Witnesses (2.0%), Baptists (1.8), Moravians (1.2%), Brethren Christian (0.5%), the Salvationists (0.4%) and Latter-day Saints ( 0.1%).

The number of non-Christians is small. 0.7% of the population are Muslims, most of whom are immigrants or descendants of Indian immigrants from the Indian state of Gujarat. There are three mosques and an Islamic centre. Other religious groups include the Rastafarians (1.0% of the population), which was introduced to Barbados in 1975, Hindus (0.5%), Jews (0.05%), the Baháʼís (0.04%) and Buddhists.

Historical statistics

Structure of the population

Structure of the population (01.05.2010) (Census) :

Other demographics statistics
Demographic statistics according to the World Population Review in 2019.

One birth every 180 minutes	
One death every 206 minutes	
One net migrant every Infinity minutes	
Net gain of one person every 1440 minutes

Demographic statistics according to the CIA World Factbook, unless otherwise indicated.

Nationality
noun: Barbadian(s) or Bajan (colloquial)
adjective: Barbadian or Bajan (colloquial)

Population 
293,131 (July 2018 est.)

Ethnic groups 
African descent 92.4%, mixed 3.1%, white 2.7%, East Indian 1.3%, other 0.2%, unspecified 0.3% (2010 est.)

Age structure

0-14 years: 17.8% (male 26,084 /female 26,090)
15-24 years: 12.53% (male 18,236 /female 18,479)
25-54 years: 43.69% (male 63,829 /female 64,249)
55-64 years: 13.62% (male 18,888 /female 21,043)
65 years and over: 12.36% (male 14,705 /female 21,528) (2018 est.)

Median age
total: 38.9 years. Country comparison to the world: 56th
male: 37.8 years 
female: 40.1 years (2018 est.)

Birth rate 
11.6 births/1,000 population (2018 est.) Country comparison to the world: 169th

Death rate 
8.6 deaths/1,000 population (2018 est.) Country comparison to the world: 73rd

Total fertility rate 
1.68 children born/woman (2018 est.) Country comparison to the world: 175th

Net migration rate
-0.3 migrant(s)/1,000 population (2018 est.) Country comparison to the world: 114th

Population growth rate 
0.26% (2018 est.) Country comparison to the world: 176th

Contraceptive prevalence rate
59.2% (2012)

Languages 
English (official), Bajan (English-based creole language, widely spoken in informal settings)

Religions 
Protestant 66.4% (includes Anglican 23.9%, other Pentecostal 19.5%, Adventist 5.9%, Methodist 4.2%, Wesleyan 3.4%, Nazarene 3.2%, Church of God 2.4%, Baptist 1.8%, Moravian 1.2%, other Protestant 0.9%), Roman Catholic 3.8%, other Christian 5.4% (includes Jehovah's Witness 2.0%, other 3.4%), Rastafarian 1%, other 1.5%, none 20.6%, unspecified 1.2% (2010 est.)

Population distribution
most densely populated country in the eastern Caribbean; approximately one-third live in urban areas

Life expectancy at birth
total population: 75.7 years 
male: 73.3 years 
female: 78.1 years (2018 est.)

Dependency ratios 
total dependency ratio: 50.4 (2015 est.)
youth dependency ratio: 29.1 (2015 est.)
elderly dependency ratio: 21.3 (2015 est.)
potential support ratio: 4.7 (2015 est.)

Urbanization 
urban population: 31.1% of total population (2018)
rate of urbanization: 0.2% annual rate of change (2015-20 est.)

Obesity - adult prevalence rate
23.1% (2016). Country comparison to the world: 67th

Literacy 
definition: age 15 and over can read and write (2014 est.)
total population: 99.6% 
male: 99% 
female: 99.6% (2014)

School life expectancy (primary to tertiary education) 
total: 15 years 
male: 14 years 
female: 17 years (2011)

Unemployment, youth ages 15–24 
total: 29.6%. Country comparison to the world: 32nd
male: 27.9% 
female: 31.5% (2016 est.)

See also
Afro-Barbadian
Indians in Barbados
White Barbadian

References

External links 
 Barbados Statistical Service (BSS)
 Barbados profile - The Commonwealth of Nations
 Barbados Profile BGIS
 CARICOM Stats

 
Society of Barbados